Me Volvi a Acordar de Ti (I Remembered You Again) is the tenth studio album released by Los Bukis in 1986. The album entered Billboards Latin Pop Albums chart at the beginning of October 1986, and peaked at number 6 on October 31 after spending four weeks on the chart.

Track listing

All songs written and composed by Marco Antonio Solís

References

External links
[] Me Volvi a Acordar de Ti on allmusic.com

Los Bukis albums
1986 albums
Fonovisa Records albums